Santang could refer to the following towns in China:

 Santang, Anhui (三堂镇), town in Taihe County
Written as "三塘镇":
 Santang, Guangxi, in Xingning District, Nanning
 Santang, Zhijin County, Guizhou
 Santang, Hengnan (三塘镇), a town of Hengnan County, Hunan.
 Santang, Xiangyin, a town of Xiangyin County, Hunan
 Santang, Yugan County, Jiangxi